Otto Bonsema (3 November 1909 in Groningen – 27 March 1994 in Groningen) was an association football player manager from the Netherlands.

Playing career

Club
He played for the Velocitas 1897 senior team from the 1929/30 season and won the 1934 KNVB Cup with the club. He moved to city rival GVAV in 1937.

International
Bonsema made his debut for the Netherlands in a May 1932 friendly match against Czechoslovakia and earned a total of 6 caps, scoring 3 goals. His final international was an April 1939 friendly against Belgium.

Managerial career
He coached SC Heerenveen, GVAV, BV Veendam.

References

External links
 

1909 births
1994 deaths
Footballers from Groningen (city)
Association football forwards
Dutch footballers
Netherlands international footballers
GVAV players
Dutch football managers
SC Heerenveen managers
SC Veendam managers